Ross Gay (born August 1, 1974) is an American poet, essayist, and professor who won the National Book Critics Circle Award for Poetry and the Kingsley Tufts Poetry Award for his 2014 book Catalog of Unabashed Gratitude, which was also a finalist for the National Book Award for Poetry.

Life
Ross Gay was born on August 1, 1974 in Youngstown, Ohio, but he grew up in Levittown, Pennsylvania. 

He received his B.A. from Lafayette College, his MFA in poetry from Sarah Lawrence College,<ref>[http://www.lafayette.edu/news.php/view/98/ Lafayette College > Alumni News > Ross Gay '96 Returns to Help Students]</ref> and his Ph.D. in American Literature from Temple University.

He is a founding editor, with Karissa Chen and Patrick Rosal, of the online sports magazine Some Call it Ballin. He is also an editor with the chapbook presses Q Avenue and Ledge Mule Press.  He is a founding board member of the Bloomington Community Orchard, a non-profit, free-fruit-for-all food justice and joy project.
 
He has taught poetry, art, and literature at Lafayette College in Easton, Pennsylvania, and Montclair State University in New Jersey. He now teaches at Indiana University in Bloomington, Indiana, and the low-residency MFA in poetry program at Drew University.Indiana University - Bloomington > Department of English Faculty > Ross Gay

His poems have appeared in literary journals and magazines including The American Poetry Review; Harvard Review; Columbia: A Journal of Poetry; Art, Margie: The American Journal of Poetry; and Atlanta Review. His poetry has also appeared in anthologies including From the Fishouse (Persea Books, 2009).  His essays have appeared in The Paris Review. 

His honors include being a Cave Canem Workshop fellow and a Bread Loaf Writers Conference Tuition Scholar, and he received a grant from the Pennsylvania Council of the Arts.Indiana University > IU Newsroom > October 15, 2009 > IU Poet Ross Gay Shares His 'Waves of Inspiration' 

Awards and honors
2015 National Book Award for Poetry, finalist for Catalog of Unabashed Gratitude2016 National Book Critics Circle Award (Poetry), winner for Catalogue of Unabashed Gratitude2016 Kingsley Tufts Poetry Award, winner for Catalog of Unabashed GratitudeWorks
 
 
 
 
 
 
 
 

In anthology
 

 Appearances on reality television shows 
 A Dating Story,'' Episode 110: Jason, Brooke and Ross

References

External links

1974 births
21st-century American poets
American male poets
Lafayette College alumni
Living people
People from Bucks County, Pennsylvania
Poets from Pennsylvania
Poets from Indiana
Sarah Lawrence College alumni
Temple University alumni
Writers from Youngstown, Ohio
Writers from Bloomington, Indiana
21st-century American male writers
Lafayette College faculty
Montclair State University faculty
Indiana University faculty
Drew University faculty